HMS L10 was a L-class submarine built for the Royal Navy during World War I. The boat was sunk in 1918 by German torpedo boats.

Design and description
L9 and its successors were enlarged to accommodate 21-inch (53.3 cm) torpedoes and more fuel. They displaced  on the surface and  submerged. The L-class submarines had a crew of 38 officers and ratings.

For surface running, the boats were powered by two 12-cylinder Vickers  diesel engines, each driving one propeller shaft. When submerged each propeller was driven by a  electric motor. They could reach  on the surface and  underwater.

The boats were armed with four 21-inch torpedo tubes in the bow and two 18-inch (45 cm) in broadside mounts. They carried four reload torpedoes for the 21-inch tubes for a grand total of ten torpedoes of all sizes. They were also armed with a  deck gun.

Construction and career
HMS L10 was built at Dumbarton by William Denny. She was assigned to serve in the North Sea against German surface units counteracting German efforts to sow mines in British waters. Her greatest success led to her destruction, when on the morning of 3 October 1918, aged just under four months, the L10 surfaced in the Heligoland Bight with the mission of intercepting a German raiding party. The other torpedo boats were crowded round their damaged comrade, and so it was easy for L10s commander, Alfred Edward Whitehouse to sneak into position and put a torpedo into the S33, which began to sink. However, as she fired, the L10 rose suddenly to the surface and was seen instantly by the V28, S33, S 60 and V79. Although she turned and tried to flee, L10 was not fast enough to escape her pursuers and was rapidly chased down and sunk at 11:03 (CET) with all hands. S33 was scuttling by a torpedo from S52. L10 was the only L-class boat to be lost during the First World War.

Discovery
On 5 March 2020, it was announced that the wreck of L10 had been found near the island of Terschelling. The discovery was made by the Danish company JD-Contractor, who were searching for the Polish Submarine .

Notes

References
 
 
 
 

 

British L-class submarines
Ships built on the River Clyde
1918 ships
World War I submarines of the United Kingdom
Lost submarines of the United Kingdom
World War I shipwrecks in the North Sea
Royal Navy ship names
Maritime incidents in 1918
Warships lost in combat with all hands